The Central women's field hockey team are an amateur sports team based in New Zealand. The team competes annually in the Ford National Hockey League (NHL).

Central have won the NHL a total of 2 times, most recently in 2009.

Team Roster
The following is the Central team roster for the 2017 Ford NHL:

Head coaches: Henry Wong

Georgia Barnett (GK)
Emily Gaddum
Hope Ralph
Emma Rainey
Michaela Curtis
Kayla Whitelock (C)
Casey-Mae Waddell
Verity Sharland
Holly Pearson
Hannah Williamson
Sheree Horvath
Beth Norman
Pippa Norman
Megan Phillips
Tegan Muraahi (GK)
Kelsey MacDonald
Tinesha Carey
Clodagh McCullough

References

Women's field hockey teams in New Zealand
2000 establishments in New Zealand